Sir Rowland Lytton (also Roland Litton) (28 September 1561 – 23 June 1615) was an English lawyer and politician who sat in the House of Commons variously between 1586 and 1611.

Life
Rowland Lytton was the only son of Rowland Lytton of Knebworth, Hertfordshire, and his second wife, Anne Carleton, daughter of John Carleton of Brightwell Baldwin, Oxfordshire, and sister of George Carleton.

He was admitted to Caius College, Cambridge in 1576 at the age of 14, and to Gray's Inn in 1579. He succeeded his father in 1582.

Lytton was a Member of Parliament for Truro, Cornwall from 1586 to 1587. He was a Justice of the Peace for Hertfordshire in 1587 to his death and Sheriff of Hertfordshire for 1594–1595. He was MP for Hertfordshire from 1597 to 1598. In 1603, he was knighted and was MP for Hertfordshire again from 1604 to 1611. He was a Deputy Lieutenant for Essex from 1605 until his death.

He died in 1615 and was buried in his chapel at Knebworth church.

Private life
He married Anne, the daughter of Sir Oliver St John, 1st Baron St John of Bletso, and widow of Robert Corbet of Moreton Corbet, Shropshire. They had 3 sons and 4 daughters. Anne (died 1612) married Sir William Webb and Judith married George Smith and then Sir Thomas Barrington, 2nd Baronet. His son William Lytton was also MP for Hertfordshire.

References

|-

|-

1561 births
1615 deaths
Alumni of Gonville and Caius College, Cambridge
Members of Gray's Inn
Members of the Parliament of England for Hertfordshire
English knights
High Sheriffs of Hertfordshire
Deputy Lieutenants of Essex
English MPs 1586–1587
English MPs 1597–1598
English MPs 1604–1611
People from Knebworth
Burials at Knebworth
Knights Bachelor
English justices of the peace